Colindale is a London Underground station in Colindale, a suburb of north-west London. The station is on the Edgware branch of the Northern line, between Burnt Oak and Hendon Central stations, and in Travelcard Zone 4.

History
The station opened on 18 August 1924 on the north side of Colindale Avenue, on what was then the 'Hampstead and Highgate Line', the first station of the second section of the extension to Edgware. The platforms were located underneath the east–west road, not just on one side, and the station had a classical style building designed by Underground Architect Stanley Heaps.

The opening of the station spurred the development of Colindale.

T. E. Lawrence regularly used the station when he was stationed at the nearby Hendon Aerodrome, and it was the source of the pen name "Colin Dale" which he used  to submit articles for The Spectator during 1927 and 1928.

Colindale tube station was severely damaged during The Blitz. At 8:45 pm on 25 September 1940 the station was hit by a large bomb. Two trains with a total of 400 people on board were at the station at the time of the explosion, and 13 people were killed. Nine rescue parties worked through the night to rescue the survivors, and the station was visited on 26 September by King George VI and Queen Elizabeth.

The simple temporary timber structure erected after the bombing actually lasted longer than the original building as it was not replaced until 1962 when a new building was constructed incorporating shops.

Attractions

The Royal Air Force Museum London is a popular destination for travellers going to Colindale. The museum is located about ten minutes by foot from the station.

The British Library Newspaper Library was situated at Colindale until 2013. Colindale tube station was also a popular destination for travellers intending to reach the shopping centre Oriental City up until its closure.

Services
The station is sometimes used as a terminus for trains travelling north, instead of them continuing to Edgware. Some regular off-peak service patterns in recent years have seen all trains joining the Edgware branch from the Bank branch terminating at Colindale, though this was not the pattern in 2009. Reversal of trains at this station makes use of a turn-back siding, situated between the running lines north of the station.

Connections
London Buses routes 125, 204, 303 and night route N5 serve the station.

Gallery

References

External links

 London Transport Museum Photographic Archive
 
 
 
 
 
 

Northern line stations
Tube stations in the London Borough of Barnet
Former London Electric Railway stations
Railway stations in Great Britain opened in 1924
London Underground Night Tube stations
Stanley Heaps railway stations